The Pakistan women's national cricket team toured England and Ireland in June and July 2013. In England, they played England in 2 One Day Internationals and 2 Twenty20 Internationals, then played Ireland in 2 T20Is and 1 ODI. They then went to Ireland, and again played Ireland, this time in 1 T20I and 2 ODIs, after which they played in the 2013 ICC Women's World Twenty20 Qualifier. England won the ODI series 2–0, whilst the two sides drew their T20I series 1–1. Pakistan won every match across their series against Ireland.

Tour of England

Squads

Tour Matches

20-over match: England Academy v Pakistan

20-over match: England Academy v Pakistan

50-over match: England Academy v Pakistan

WODI Series: England v Pakistan

1st ODI

2nd ODI

WT20I Series: England v Pakistan

1st T20I

2nd T20I

WT20I Series: Ireland v Pakistan

1st T20I

2nd T20I

Only ODI: Ireland v Pakistan

Tour of Ireland

Squads

Tour Match: Ireland Men Under-15s v Pakistan

Only T20I

WODI Series

1st ODI

2nd ODI

See also
 2013 ICC Women's World Twenty20 Qualifier

References

External links
Pakistan Women tour of England 2013 from Cricinfo
Pakistan Women tour of Ireland 2013 from Cricinfo

Pakistan women's national cricket team tours
Women's cricket tours of England
Women's international cricket tours of Ireland
International cricket competitions in 2013
2013 in women's cricket
2013 in Pakistani women's sport